This list is of the Cultural Properties of Japan designated in the category of  for the Prefecture of Tokushima.

National Cultural Properties
As of 1 January 2015, six Important Cultural Properties have been designated, being of national significance.

Prefectural Cultural Properties
As of 19 December 2014, twenty-nine properties have been designated at a prefectural level.

See also
 Cultural Properties of Japan
 List of National Treasures of Japan (paintings)
 Japanese painting

References

External links
  List of Cultural Properties in Tokushima Prefecture

Cultural Properties,Tokushima
Cultural Properties,Paintings
Paintings,Tokushima
Lists of paintings